See also Batoche (former electoral district) and Batoche (N.W.T. electoral district)

Batoche is a provincial electoral district for the Legislative Assembly of Saskatchewan, Canada. It is located in north central Saskatchewan and has an economy based primarily on mixed agriculture and farm implement manufacturing. Bourgault Industries in St. Brieux manufactures harrows, cultivators, ploughs.  The Batoche area is where Louis Riel led his Metis people in an armed uprising against the Canadian government in 1885. Batoche National Historic Site is located in this constituency.

A former electoral district of the same name was in existence from 1905 until 1908.

The largest communities are Birch Hills, Wakaw and Cudworth with populations of 935, 884 and 766, respectively. Smaller centres in the riding include the villages of St. Brieux, St. Louis, Lake Lenore, Duck Lake, Weldon and Middle Lake; and the town of Kinistino.

History

Constituency

This riding was created by The Representation Act, 2002 (Saskatchewan). This constituency was a formed from parts of the Humboldt, Melfort-Tisdale, Prince Albert Carlton, Rosthern, Saskatchewan Rivers and Shellbrook-Spiritwood ridings.

Member of Legislative Assembly

Election results

2020 Saskatchewan general election

2016 Saskatchewan general election

2011 Saskatchewan general election

2007 Saskatchewan general election

2003 Saskatchewan general election

See also
Batoche – Northwest Territories territorial electoral district (1870–1905).
Duck Lake, Saskatchewan
Batoche, Saskatchewan
List of Saskatchewan provincial electoral districts
List of Saskatchewan general elections

References

External links
Website of the Legislative Assembly of Saskatchewan
Elections Saskatchewan - Official Results of the 2011 Provincial Election
Saskatchewan Archives Board – Saskatchewan Election Results By Electoral Division

Saskatchewan provincial electoral districts